The Studio Art Quilt Associates, abbreviated as SAQA, is a leading non-profit advocacy group for art quilts based in Hebron, Connecticut, in the United States.

Formation

In the book, American Quilts: The Democratic Art, 1780-2007, Robert Shaw states, "Contemporary quilts were rarely seen in major art publications or in museum and gallery exhibitions, and critical writing about unconventional quilts was almost nonexistent."

Shaw further writes, "Realizing that they could not wait for attention to come to them, artist-quiltmakers began to take matters into their own hands.  In 1989, California quiltmaker Yvonne Porcella founded Studio Art Quilt Associates, a nonprofit advocacy group dedicated to "serving artists working in the art quilt medium." The first Board of Directors consisted of Yvonne Porcella, Holly Junker, Beth Gutcheon, Marti Michell, and Roderick Kiracofe. SAQA sought to establish the place of artist-made quilts among contemporary fine art, to serve as a forum for the professional development of quilt artists, and to act as an informative resource for curators, dealers, art consultants, teachers, students, and collectors. An initial group of about fifty quilt artists contributed seed money and volunteered time to implement the founding of the organization, which continues to be a strong voice today".

Defining the Art Quilt

In the past, SAQA had defined the art quilt as: "A contemporary art work exploring and expressing aesthetic concerns common to the whole range of visual arts, painting, printing, photography, graphic design, assemblage, and sculpture, which retains however through material or technique a clear relationship to the folk art quilt from which it descends".

As of 2012, in response to a membership survey, SAQA has broadened the working definition of an art quilt to, "A creative visual work that is layered and stitched or that references this form of stitched layered structure".

References

External links 
 SAQA.com The official web pages Studio Art Quilt Associates

International artist groups and collectives
Arts organizations established in 1989
Organizations established in 1989
1989 establishments in Connecticut
Quilting
Hebron, Connecticut